Igor Jesus Maciel da Cruz, commonly known as Igor Jesus, is a Brazilian footballer who plays as a forward for Shabab Al Ahli.

Career
Igor Jesus came through the youth ranks at Coritiba, having been at the clubs since he was 13 years old. He was given a place in the senior side in 2019, and made his debut as a substitute on 23 January 2019, in the Campeonato Paranaense game against Maringá. He scored his first senior goal on his first start for the team, in the same competition on 30 January 2019 against Athletico Paranaense. On 18 March 2019 he signed a new contract, keeping his rights with Coritiba until the end of 2022.
He made his national league debut in the 2019 Campeonato Brasileiro Série B match against CRB on 20 May 2019.

Career statistics

Honours
Shabab Al-Ahl
UAE Super Cup (1): 2020
UAE League Cup (1): 2020–21

References

External links
 

Living people
2001 births
People from Cuiabá
Brazilian footballers
Brazilian expatriate footballers
Association football forwards
Campeonato Brasileiro Série B players
UAE Pro League players
Expatriate footballers in the United Arab Emirates
Brazilian expatriate sportspeople in the United Arab Emirates
Coritiba Foot Ball Club players
Shabab Al-Ahli Club players
Sportspeople from Mato Grosso